The Ongoing Concept is a metal band from Rathdrum, Idaho, formed in 2009. They have released two independent EPs and three studio albums. The band currently consists of vocalist/guitarist Dawson Scholz, vocalist Kyle Scholz, drummer Parker Scholz, bassist TJ Nichols and vocalist/guitarist Andy Crateau.

History
The Ongoing Concept was formed in 2009 by brothers Kyle, Dawson, and Parker Scholz, while they were still in high school. Following their formation, the trio hired their childhood friends Dyllan Darrington and TJ Nichols. In 2010, the band recorded an EP titled What Is My Destiny, which was released independently on April 23, 2010. The EP displayed a stylistic dichotomy between acoustic rock and metalcore. The band followed up with another EP in 2011, titled Arrows Before Bullets, which took a heavier approach, following an electronicore style. Once the EP was released, Darrington departed from the band, with them continuing on as a four-piece. On June 20, 2013, the band announced their signing to Solid State Records. Along with the announcement, they released their first single, "Cover Girl", off of their debut album Saloon, which released in August 20th 2013. For the Billboard charting week of September 7, 2013, Saloon charted at No. 38 on the Heatseekers Albums chart. Two years later, the band released their sophomore effort Handmade, where they crafted the instruments they used, save for keyboards and microphones, out of a tree they chopped down.  Following the album's release, by 2016, Kyle, Parker, and Nichols had departed from the band. Dawson hired on longtime friend and band videographer Ian Nelson on bass, Andy Crateau on guitars, and Cody Rhodes on drums. With the new lineup, the band recorded their third release, titled Places, which exhibited more of a somber style. After the album was issued, the band ceased activity until 2022. With the return of the original lineup along with Crateau, the band announced efforts for a new album in early 2023. The first single, "Prisoner Again", was released on February 3, 2023, along with the preorder for the upcoming album, Again, which will be released on March 31, 2023.

Members

Current
 Dawson Scholz – vocals, guitar (2009–present)
 Andy Crateau - guitar, vocals (2016–present)
 Parker Scholz – drums  (2009–2015, 2021–present), vocals (2009-2010)
 Kyle Scholz – vocals (2011-2015, 2021–present), keyboards and percussion (2009–2015, 2021–present)
 TJ Nichols – bass guitar, banjo (2009–2015, 2021–present)

Former
 Dyllan Darrington - guitar, vocals (2009-2012)
 Ian Nelson - bass guitar (2016–2019)
 Cody Rhodes - drums (2016–2019)

Timeline

Discography

Studio albums

Independent EPs

References

External links
 
 HM Magazine story

Solid State Records artists
Musical groups established in 2009
Rock music groups from Idaho
2009 establishments in Idaho
Metalcore musical groups from Idaho